Denise Weyers is a South African former cricketer who played as an all-rounder. She appeared in three Test matches for South Africa in 1972, all against New Zealand, scoring six runs and taking five wickets. She played domestic cricket for Western Province.

References

External links
 
 

Living people
Year of birth missing (living people)
Date of birth missing (living people)
Cricketers from Cape Town
South African women cricketers
South Africa women Test cricketers
Western Province women cricketers